Sigma Motors Limited was founded in 1994 and is responsible for the marketing and assembly of Land Rover 4x4's in Pakistan. Sigma Motors uses idle capacity at the Ghandhara Nissan Limited plant at Port Qasim to assemble vehicles, under a contract assembly agreement with the Ministry of Defence. Defender being one of the toughest off-road vehicle is currently manufactured here. The assembly plant of Sigma Motors has annual production capacity of 2000 units.

 Discovery
 Discovery Sport
 Land Rover Defender
 Range Rover
 Range Rover Evoque
 Range Rover Sport
 Range Rover Velar

References

External links
 Official website
 
Land Rover Cars Price In Pakistan

Land Rover
Car manufacturers of Pakistan
Manufacturing companies based in Lahore
Vehicle manufacturing companies established in 1994
Pakistani companies established in 1994